Phyxium is a genus of longhorn beetles of the subfamily Lamiinae, containing the following species:

 Phyxium bufonium Pascoe, 1864
 Phyxium ignarum Pascoe, 1864
 Phyxium lanatum Fauvel, 1906
 Phyxium loriai Breuning, 1943
 Phyxium papuanum Breuning, 1943
 Phyxium scorpioides Pascoe, 1864

References

Lamiinae